David Honzík (born 9 August 1993) is a Czech professional ice hockey goaltender who currently playing for HK Dukla Trenčín of the Slovak Extraliga.

Career
Honzík began playing for HC Karlovy Vary's academy team at U18 and U20 level before he was drafted 33rd overall by the Victoriaville Tigres of the Quebec Major Junior Hockey League in the 2010 CHL Import Draft. In his first season in the QMJHL, Honzík participated in the CHL Top Prospects Game. He was then drafted 71st overall by the Vancouver Canucks in the 2011 NHL Entry Draft but never signed with the Canucks and instead spent two more seasons in the QMJHL with the Tigres and later the Cape Breton Screaming Eagles before returning to Karlovy Vary.

Honzík made his Czech Extraliga debut for Karlovy Vary during the 2015 Relegation Round. He then had a loan spell with HC Dukla Jihlava before returning to the Karlovy Vary lineup for the 2016–17 Czech Extraliga season. On May 11, 2017, Honzík signed for HC Sparta Praha. He had two separate loan spells with HC Slavia Praha before returning to Dukla Jihlava on a permanent deal on January 16, 2019. On May 9, 2019, Honzík signed a contract with HC Litvínov.

Career statistics

Regular season and playoffs

References

External links
 

1993 births
Living people
HC Baník Sokolov players
Cape Breton Screaming Eagles players
Czech ice hockey goaltenders
HC Dukla Jihlava players
HC Frýdek-Místek players
HC Karlovy Vary players
HC Litvínov players
HK Nitra players
HC Slavia Praha players
HC Sparta Praha players
People from Milevsko
Vancouver Canucks draft picks
Victoriaville Tigres players
Sportspeople from the South Bohemian Region
PSG Berani Zlín players
HK Dukla Trenčín players
Czech expatriate ice hockey players in Canada
Czech expatriate ice hockey players in Slovakia